GQ Lupi is a T Tauri variable star approximately 495 light-years away in the constellation of Lupus. The star is young and has about 70% of the Sun's mass.

Possible planetary system
In 2005, Ralph Neuhäuser and his colleagues reported a substellar object, GQ Lupi b, orbiting the star.  Along with 2M1207b, this was one of the first extrasolar planet candidates to be directly imaged.  The image was made with the VLT telescope at Paranal Observatory, Chile, on June 25, 2004.  Depending on its mass and the definition of a planet, GQ Lupi b may or may not be considered a planet.  As of 2006, the International Astronomical Union Working Group on Extrasolar Planets described GQ Lupi b as a "possible planetary-mass companion to a young star." GQ Lupi b is listed as "confirmed planet" as in 2020.

In 2020, another low-mass companion of GQ Lupi was discovered at a separation distance of about 16 arcseconds, or 2400 AU. Designated 2MASS J15491331-3539118 under the 2MASS catalogue, it is likely a young stellar object that is gravitationally bound to its primary star. It is estimated to be approximately 15% the Sun's mass and 21% the Sun's radius. It has an effective temperature of about 3190 K, indicating that it is a red dwarf with the spectral type M4.

References

External links
 The low-mass companion of GQ Lup, E.W. Guenther, R. Neuhaeuser, G. Wuchterl, M. Mugrauer, A. Bedalov, and P.H. Hauschildt, Astronomische Nachrichten 326, #10 (December 2005), pp. 958–963.  .  
R. Neuhaeuser (2005). "Homogeneous comparison of directly detected planet candidates: GQ Lup, 2M1207, AB Pic". arXiv:astro-ph/0509906v1.

Planetary systems with one confirmed planet
Lupus (constellation)
T Tauri stars
K-type main-sequence stars
Lupi, GQ
Durchmusterung objects